The Citadel Bulldogs basketball statistical leaders are individual statistical leaders of The Citadel Bulldogs basketball program in various categories, including points, rebounds, assists, steals, and blocks. Within those areas, the lists identify single-game, single-season, and career leaders. The Bulldogs represent The Citadel in the NCAA's Southern Conference.

The Citadel began competing in intercollegiate basketball in 1900. However, the school's record book does not generally list records from before the 1950s, as records from before this period are often incomplete and inconsistent. Since scoring was much lower in this era, and teams played much fewer games during a typical season, it is likely that few or no players from this era would appear on these lists anyway.

The NCAA did not officially record assists as a stat until the 1983–84 season, and blocks and steals until the 1985–86 season, but The Citadel's record books includes players in these stats before these seasons. These lists are updated through the end of the 2020–21 season.

Scoring

Rebounds

Assists

Steals

Blocks

References

Citadel
Statistical